Bernhard's elephant-snout fish (Mormyrus bernhardi) is a species of ray-finned fish in the family Mormyridae. It is endemic to Athi-Galana-Sabaki River, Kenya; it is threatened by fishing.

Sources 

Mormyrus
Endemic freshwater fish of Kenya
Fish described in 1926
Taxonomy articles created by Polbot